LP 40-365 is a low-mass white dwarf star in the constellation Ursa Minor. It travels at high speed through the Milky Way and has a very unusual elemental composition, lacking hydrogen, helium or carbon. It may have been produced in a subluminous Type Iax supernova that failed to destroy its host star totally.
 The "LP" name is derived from the Luyten-Palomar proper motion catalogue in which it appeared in the 1960s. Another catalog name for this star is "GD 492".
 The star was cataloged as a Giclas object with the designation "GD 492" being assigned by Henry Giclas in 1970.

References

External links 
 ESO Online Digitized Sky Survey

White dwarfs
High-proper-motion stars
Ursa Minor (constellation)
Runaway stars